is a film based on the 2006 popular TV series Kurosagi.

After the finale of the TV series in June, TBS received many questions about whether there would be a new season or a film. TBS decided to shoot a film, beginning in August 2007.

On March 8, 2008, the cast appeared on stage at TOHO Cinemas Roppongi Hills. At the end of the conference, a guard with a suitcase filled with 3,800,000,000 yen (since it was March 8) appeared on stage. Yamashita said he would make another Kurosagi film, shooting it overseas.

The official theme song is "Taiyō no Namida". It is performed by NEWS, a 6-member band. Tomohisa Yamashita, who also plays the lead role, is in the band.

Plot
A young man named Kurosaki had his family destroyed by con artists. When he grows up, he becomes a swindler to avenge his family. He swindles other con artists and returns the money to their victims.

Cast

 Tomohisa Yamashita as Kurosagi (Kurosaki)
 Maki Horikita as Yoshikawa Tsurara
 Yui Ichikawa as Mishima Yukari
 Mao Daichi as Sakura
 Naoto Takenaka as Ishigaki Tetsu
 Renji Ishibashi

References

External links
 Official site
 

2008 films
Television shows written by Eriko Shinozaki
Films about fraud
Films scored by Kousuke Yamashita
2000s Japanese films